Brodetske, may refer to the following places in Ukraine:

Brodetske, Cherkasy Oblast, village in Zvenyhorodka Raion
Brodetske, Vinnytsia Oblast, urban-type settlement in Khmilnyk Raion